Eleonora Gonzaga, Duchess of Urbino (31 December 1493 – 13 February 1550) was Duchess and sometime regent of Urbino  by marriage to  Francesco Maria I della Rovere, duke of Urbino. She served as regent during the absence of her spouse in 1532.

Life
She was the eldest of the seven children of Francesco II Gonzaga, Marquess of Mantua, and Isabella d'Este. Her father was a notorious libertine, her mother a famous patroness of the arts. On 25 September 1509 she married Francesco Maria I della Rovere, duke of Urbino, son of Giovanni della Rovere, duca di Sora e Senegaglia, and Giovanna da Montefeltro, and nephew of Pope Julius II. Their surviving children, two sons and three daughters, would all have progeny.

Eleonora, who was largely responsible for the internal government of Urbino during her husband's exile, was an important patron of the arts in her own right. A princess of the highest culture, she was the friend of Pietro Bembo, Sadolet and Baldassarre Castiglione, as well as Torquato Tasso. Titian painted her once formally, in 1537, a companion to his portrait of her husband Francesco from the same year, but her face appears to be recognisable in three other Titian paintings of about that time: La Bella, Girl in the Fur Cloak and possibly the Venus of Urbino commissioned by her son Guidobaldo.

Issue
Federico della Rovere (1511 — died aged two months).
Guidobaldo II della Rovere (2 April 1514 — 28 September 1574), married Giulia Varano and had issue; married Vittoria Farnese (daughter of Pier Luigi Farnese, Duke of Parma) had issue (ancestors of Maria Teresa Cybo-Malaspina).
Giovanna della Rovere (1515 — 1518).
Giovanni della Rovere (1516 — 1518).
Caterina della Rovere (1518 — 1520).
Beatrice della Rovere (1521 — 1522).
Francesco Maria della Rovere (1523 — 1525).
Ippolita della Rovere (1525 — 1561), reportedly married Antonio of Aragon, Duke of Montalto, son of Fernando de Aragón, 1st Duke of Montalto.
Maria della Rovere (1527 — 1528).
Elisabetta della Rovere (1529 — 6 June 1561), married Alberico I Cybo-Malaspina, Marquis of Massa and had issue (ancestors of Maria Teresa Cybo-Malaspina).
Giulia Feltria della Rovere (1531 — 4 April 1563), married Alfonso d'Este, Lord of Montecchio and had issue (were parents of Cesare d'Este, Duke of Modena).
Giulio Feltrio della Rovere (1533 — 1578), became a cardinal then later had issue (illegitimate):Ippolito and Giulio.
Violante della Rovere (1535 — 1538).

References

1493 births
1570 deaths
Nobility of Mantua
16th-century Italian women
16th-century Italian nobility
Della Rovere family
Eleonora Gonzaga (1493-1570)
Duchesses of Urbino
Italian artists' models
16th-century women rulers